Dániel Buday (born 5 January 1981 in Hódmezővásárhely) is a retired Hungarian handballer who most recently played for Orosházi FKSE.

A former Hungarian international, Buday played at two European Championships (2004, 2006) and at the World Championship in 2003.

Achievements
Nemzeti Bajnokság I:
Winner: 2004, 2005, 2006
Magyar Kupa:
Winner: 2004, 2005, 2007
EHF Cup Winners' Cup:
Finalist: 2008

References

External links
 Dániel Buday profile at SC Pick Szeged official website
 Dániel Buday career statistics at Worldhandball

1981 births
Living people
People from Hódmezővásárhely
Hungarian male handball players
Expatriate handball players
Hungarian expatriate sportspeople in Germany
Hungarian expatriate sportspeople in Switzerland
Rhein-Neckar Löwen players
Sportspeople from Csongrád-Csanád County